Secondary Highway 672, commonly referred to as Highway 672, is a provincially maintained secondary highway in the Canadian province of Ontario. The  route lies within Timiskaming and Cochrane district, connecting Highway 66 — part of the Trans-Canada Highway — in the south with Highway 101 in the north. It is the only highway to provide access to Esker Lakes Provincial Park. Though the highway was first assumed by the province in 1990, the existing road had been built north from Highway 66 to the provincial park in 1977 and extended to Highway 101 in the late 1980s.

Route description 
Highway 672 begins at a junction with Highway 66, part of the Trans-Canada Highway, east of Kirkland Lake. It proceeds north past the Timiskaming–Cochrane District boundary, travelling through and providing the only road access to Esker Lakes Provincial Park.

Like other provincial routes in Ontario, Highway 672 is maintained by the Ministry of Transportation of Ontario. In 2010, traffic surveys conducted by the ministry showed that on average, 280 vehicles used the highway daily along the section near Highway 66 while 150 vehicles did so each day along the section near Highway 101, the highest and lowest counts along the highway, respectively.

History
Highway 672 was built out of an access road that travelled north from Highway 66 to Esker Lakes Provincial Park that existed as early as 1977,
Between 1986 and 1988, this road was extended north through the park and beyond to meet with Highway 101.
By 1990, the road was given the Highway 672 designation. It appears for the first time on the 1990 Official Road Map as a paved road;
however, it does not appear in the 1989 Highway Distance Table published eight months earlier.
The route has remained unchanged since.

Major intersections

References 

672